Richard Chapman (c. 1504 – 1580), of Bath, Somerset, was an English politician.

He was a Member (MP) of the Parliament of England for Bath in October 1553. He was Mayor of Bath in 1554–55.

References

1504 births
1580 deaths
Mayors of Bath, Somerset
English MPs 1553 (Mary I)